Herbert Edward Dell (January 28, 1889 - January 1964) was an American football Head Coach who was the coach of the Columbus Panhandles for one season. In 1922 he was coach and had an 0-8 record.

References

1889 births
1964 deaths